Jules Verne (1828–1905) was a French futuristic author.

Jules Verne may also refer to:

Places
 Jules Verne (crater), a crater on the Moon

Facilities and structures
 University of Picardie Jules Verne, a university in Amiens, Picardy, France
 École secondaire Jules-Verne, a school in Vancouver, British Columbia, Canada

Vehicles and transportation
 Jules Verne (train), a French express train that operated in the 1980s
 French ship Jules Verne, a list of ships of the French Navy
 Jules Verne (A620), a French Navy repair ship launched in 1970 as Achéron
 Jules Verne ATV, a European Space Agency spacecraft
 RSS Jules Verne, a Blue Origin space capsule for New Shepard

Characters
 Jules Verne Durand, an alien character in SciFi novel Anathem by Neal Stephenson
 Jules Verne, a character from The Secret Adventures of Jules Verne

Other uses
 Jules Verne Trophy, a non-stop sail race around the world
 Le Jules Verne, a gourmet restaurant on the second floor of the Eiffel Tower

See also

 
 Verne (disambiguation)
 Vern (disambiguation)
 Jul (disambiguation)
 Jules
 Jule